This is a list of notable converts to Buddhism from Hinduism.

Organized mass conversions

Since Ambedkar's conversion, several thousand people from different castes have converted to Buddhism in ceremonies including the twenty-two vows.
 600,000 People's Mass Conversion  (1956) Converted in one assembly led by B.R. Ambedkar at Deekshabhoomi in Nagpur.  this ceremonial conversion continued after his death, converting 15-20 million by March 1959.
 In 1957 Mahastvir Bodhanand's Sri Lankan successor, Bhante Pragyanand, held a mass conversion drive for 15,000 people in Lucknow.
 A prominent Indian Navayana Buddhist leader and political activist, Udit Raj, organised a large mass conversion on 4 November 2001, where he gave the 22 vows, but the event met with active opposition from the government. A report from the UK daily The Guardian said that some Hindus have converted to Buddhism. Buddhist monks from the UK and the U.S. attended the conversion ceremonies in India. Lalit Kumar, who works for a Hindu nationalist welfare association in Andhra Pradesh, asserted that Dalits should concentrate on trying to reduce illiteracy and poverty rather than looking for new religions.

 On 14 October 2006, hundreds of people converted from Hinduism to Buddhism in Gulburga (Karnataka).
 At 50th anniversary celebrations in 2006 of Ambedkar's deeksha. Non-partisan sources put the number of attendees (not converts) at 30,000. The move was criticised by Hindu groups as "unhelpful" and has been criticised as a "political stunt."

 On 27 May 2007, tens of thousands of Dalits from Maharashtra gathered at the Mahalakshmi racecourse in Mumbai to mark the 50th anniversary of the conversion of Ambedkar. The number of people who converted versus the number of people in attendance was not clear. The event was organised by the Republican Party of India leader Ramdas Athvale.
500,000 OBC's Mass Conversion (2016) in Nagpur
10,000 dalits in Uttar Pradesh district convert to Buddhism 
100,000 People's Mass Conversion (2007) in Maharashtra
 Four Dalit youngsters, who were flogged by self-styled cow vigilantes for skinning a dead cow in Gujarat in 2016, embraced Buddhism along with their families and about 450 others, to protest against discrimination and atrocities against them
 Rohith Vemula's mother, brother embrace Buddhism.Mother and brother of Dalit scholar Rohith Vemula, who committed suicide at Hyderabad Central University in January sparking strong protests across the country, embraced Buddhism on the occasion of Dr. B.R. Ambedkar's 125th birth anniversary
500 Dalits from various parts of Gujarat embraced Buddhism on Tuesday in three separate programmes held in Ahmedabad, Mehsana and Idar of Sabarkantha district on the occasion of Vijayadashami.

References

 
Buddhism from Hinduism
 Buddhism